St. Mary Catholic Parish is a Roman Catholic parish based in the Meilahti neighborhood of Helsinki, Finland. Pastoral care is entrusted to the Priests of the Sacred Heart.

Like other Finnish Catholic parishes, which are all part of the Diocese of Helsinki, the area served by the parish is broad, stretching from the western extent of Uusimaa to Riihimäki to Hanko. The parish area includes the diocesan retreat center, Stella Maris; the diocesan broadcaster, Redemptoris Mater; and the Carmelite convent in Espoo. The vast majority of parishioners reside in Greater Helsinki, including many foreigners; regular services are held in Swedish, English, Vietnamese, Polish, Spanish, and German as well as Finnish.

St. Mary's was established in 1954, the second Catholic congregation in the western Helsinki area to be established since the Protestant Reformation. Bishop Willem Cobben consecrated the parish church on December 6, 1954, whose facilities include a church hall and rectory. A parochial school was opened the same year.

Parish church 

The church was designed by architect Kaj Salenius  in the Modern style. The sanctuary is flanked by paintings of the patroness, the Virgin Mary, in depictions of the Woman of the Apocalypse and of the Assumption of Mary. These, along with the baptismal font, window paintings, and statue of Mary were created by the Dutch artist Lou Manche. The statue is a Madonna in the form of a Seat of Wisdom and carved from stone.

The current altar, set in the middle of the chancel, contains relics of Saint Bridget of Sweden and of her daughter Saint Catherine of Sweden. The old altar, set against the wall, contains relics of Saint Pius X, Saint Christopher, and Saint Maria Goretti. The altar wall, contributed in 1985, is a natural stone mosaic by German artist Claus Kilian of the Crucifixion of Jesus, surrounded by the Four Evangelists.

In the rear of the church is a mechanical two-manual organ with seventeen registers by Swedish artist Richard Jacoby in 1965. The bell tower has three bells which are rung on Sundays before Mass and on special occasions.

See also
Catholic Church in Finland
Roman Catholic Diocese of Helsinki
St. Henry's Cathedral

References

External links

Churches in Helsinki
Roman Catholic churches completed in 1954
Christian organizations established in 1955
1955 establishments in Finland
20th-century Roman Catholic church buildings in Finland